The Throne of Fire is a 2011 fantasy adventure novel written by American author Rick Riordan. It is the second novel in The Kane Chronicles series, which tells of the adventures of modern-day fourteen-year-old Carter Kane and his twelve-year-old sister - Sadie Kane, as they discover that they are descended from the ancient Egyptian pharaohs Narmer and Ramesses the Great. It was released on May 3, 2011. The book takes place roughly three months after the first book, The Red Pyramid. It is followed by the third and final book in the series, The Serpent's Shadow, which was released on May 1, 2012.

Plot

Sadie and Carter Kane must find the three scrolls of the Book of Ra, to wake the sun god Ra from his sleep, and stop Apophis, the serpent of chaos, from destroying the world. The first scroll is hidden inside the Brooklyn Museum. With two of their magician trainees, Jaz and Walt, the Kane siblings manage to retrieve the scroll, fighting off a griffin and evil spirits. That night as she sleeps, Sadie's ba (soul) leaves her body and travels to the Hall of Ages, the House of Life's headquarters. She sees Desjardins, the Chief Lector of the House of Life, discussing a plot to destroy Brooklyn House with a man named Vladimir Menshikov. Meanwhile, Carter's ba meets with the god Horus, who warns him that the gods might attack him if he tries to wake Ra.

On Sadie's birthday, she decides to go to London to visit friends, but is attacked by the baboon god Babi and the vulture goddess Nekhbet, who are possessing her grandparents. She is rescued by Bes, the dwarf god. He then accompanies Sadie and Carter to the Hermitage Museum in St. Petersburg. There, the siblings find the second scroll with Menshikov, who has summoned Set and trapped him in a vase. Menshikov discovers them and unleashes a four-legged, two-headed snake that wounds and poisons Carter before Sadie kills it. Sadie is no match for Menshikov's magic, so she releases Set from the vase, and he knocks Menshikov unconscious. Set tells Sadie the location of the third scroll and the name of Zia's home village. In exchange, Sadie gives back his secret name, releasing her control over him. Then, she heals Carter.

Carter and Sadie separate: Walt helps Sadie find the third scroll in the Valley of Golden Mummies, and Bes escorts Carter to Zia's village. Walt and Sadie successfully obtain the third scroll after warding off a horde of angry Roman mummies. Carter and Bes find Zia in an induced sleep. Carter wakes her, and Zia, having no memories of the adventures her shabti (animated clay or wax figures that can appear to be real humans or animals) had with Carter, attacks him, believing him to be a traitor. Desjardins and Menshikov arrive, and they cage Bes and decide to execute Carter. Sadie and Walt appear just in time, releasing Bes from his cage. Bes banishes Menshikov and Desjardins back to the Hall of Ages, and Menshikov begins assembling a demonic task force to destroy Brooklyn House. Sadie persuades Zia to join forces with them, and Zia and Walt leave to defend Brooklyn House. Carter and Sadie climb into Ra's boat and travel into the Duat to retrace Ra's journey along the River of Night, through the Houses of Night.

On the way, they encounter a giant man with horns, one of three aspects of Ra's soul. They read to him from the first scroll of Ra, and he allows them to pass. The siblings travel through a Lake of Fire, and Bes joins them at the Fourth House, a special care facility for elderly, forgotten minor gods. Tawaret, a fertility goddess who takes the form of a hippo and shares a turbulent romantic history with Bes, runs the facility. By reading from the second scroll, Carter and Sadie find Ra and wake him. He is old, feeble, and has the mind of a child; he seems unaware of his surroundings and constantly speaks gibberish. The Kanes continue down the River of Night until they reach the Seventh House. Unfortunately, they cannot continue through the Eighth House, because it is past eight o'clock. To finish their journey, Carter, Sadie and Bes play a game of senet with the moon god Khonsu, gambling their rens (secret names) for three extra hours of moonlight. They successfully earn three hours at the cost of Bes's ren. The Kanes resume their journey deep into the Duat to the pit where Apophis is imprisoned. Menshikov, already there and waiting for the siblings, challenges them to a duel. While Carter keeps Menshikov preoccupied, Sadie reads the third scroll to wake the third part of Ra's soul, which takes the form of a golden scarab. Apophis possesses Menshikov and prepares to destroy the Kanes, but Desjardins appears. He execrates Apophis even deeper into the Duat, but kills himself in the process.

As dawn approaches, the Kanes travel back to Brooklyn House, which is being attacked by demons, evil magicians, monsters and flying snakes. Carter and Sadie help defend it while Bast escorts a still incoherent Ra to his place in the sky, but not before he gives the golden scarab to Zia. After winning the battle, the Kanes give the enemy magicians the option to join them and learn the path of the gods. Some accept; others flee. Because Apophis' defeat is only temporary, Sadie and Carter must work harder than ever to unite all magicians. The gods reluctantly acknowledge Sadie and Carter's victory and pledge to fight beside them in the coming war against the forces of Chaos.

Characters
 Carter Kane: a fourteen-year-old magician and previously a host of Horus, the god of war. Since he was eight, after his mother died, he traveled with his father, Julius Kane. He is in love with Zia, a young house magician. He feels deep responsibility for his sister and the rest of the young magicians living at Brooklyn House. He has a love for Egyptian history and can name most artifacts. He is a very skilled combat magician.

 Sadie Kane: a thirteen-year-old magician and previously a host of Isis. She loves gum and has lived with her grandparents since the age of six. She has a stubborn and strong-minded personality, but is also caring and kind. She had a cat named Muffin later revealed to be Bast, the Egyptian goddess of cats, who protected Sadie in her cat form her until Sadie found out about the Egyptian gods. She also has a double crush on Anubis and Walt. Although having an English accent in the first book, after living in the States for a few months, starts to use an American accent.

 Amos Kane: Sadie and Carter's uncle, who is a very powerful magician and a jazz musician. He used to be the unwilling host of Set. However, this still affects him as his magic leaves a red mark instead of blue, which was also Carter and Sadie's dad's magic color.

Walt Stone: one of Sadie and Carter's initiates at the Brooklyn House, which is a part of the House of Life that urges magicians to return to the path of the gods to battle Apophis. Walt is a descendant of the pharaoh Akhenaten, who exiled all the gods except the god Aten. Therefore, Akhenaten's descendants have been cursed and the more they practice magic, the faster it progresses. The curse causes its victims to die at a very young age. Walt suffers from this curse, and will die soon, unless he receives the cure Vladimir may hold. Sadie is in love with him, and refers to him as "hot".

Jaz: also known as Jasmine, a cheerleader from Nashville, Tennessee, one of Sadie and Carter's initiates at the Brooklyn House. She is a healer, and follows the path of the goddess Sekhmet. She accompanies them to the Brooklyn Museum to find a scroll from the Book of Ra, but falls into a coma after stopping the Arrows of Sekhmet when they were accidentally unleashed. She also gives Sadie a statue that is used to help save Carter from the bite of the monster they meet in Russia. She comes out of her coma just in time to fight some magicians attacking the Brooklyn House.

 Bast : the Egyptian goddess of cats and Sadie's and Carter's protector.

Vladamir Menshikov: grandson of the great General of the Russian Empire, Alexander Menshikov 18th. His nome is Russia. He has been (willingly) enslaved by Apophis. He tries to become the host of the Apophis to release him and let chaos rule forever. Sadie and Carter go on a quest to stop him.

Zia Rashid, a fourteen-year-old girl who is a fire specialist in House of Life. She was hosting Nephthys, a water goddess, which can be fatal for a fire specialist. The former Chief Lector Iskandar hid her in the Nile to protect her from Apophis and replaced her with a shabti to cover her absence in the first book. In this book the real Zia is finally awakened by Carter.

 Bes, the dwarf god, although very ugly, has a fun and brave personality. He helps Carter and Sadie in their quest until his ren is devoured by the moon god Khonsu. Although Tawaret loved him, he preferred Bast who knew of his feelings but used them to her advantage.

 Anubis, the Egyptian god of death and funerals, Sadie Kane appears to have a double crush on him and Walt. He gives Sadie some information about where the second scroll in and gives her a netjeri knife to "the opening of the mouth" during the Babi and Nekhbet chase.

 Ra, the Egyptian god of the sun. King of all gods. Forced to exile a long time ago by Isis, the goddess of magic. He is senile in this book, as he had been essentially 'dead' for a long time. Carter and Sadie revive him in the Duat so he can stop Apophis from swallowing the sun and taking over the world.

Adaptation 
A graphic novel adaptation was released on October 6, 2015.

Sequel
Rick Riordan announced that there will be a sequel coming out on May 3, 2011. The title, The Serpent's Shadow, was announced in a blog post by Riordan on January 13, 2011. The book was released worldwide on May 3, 2011. 
A preview was published in USA Today.

Critical reception
Kirkus Reviews reviewed the episode positively, writing, "This volume begins so thunderously that the narrators seem more like frenetic tour guides than friendly companions, pulling readers along at a breakneck pace. Riordan supplies them with his trademark wisecracking voice and explores themes of power, responsibility, family, love and loyalty as the tale hurtles along."

References

External links

 The Kane Chronicles at The Worlds of Rick Riordan (Disney: readriordan.com)
 Rick Riordan Myth Master at publisher Penguin Books (UK)
 

2011 American novels
The Kane Chronicles
2011 fantasy novels
Brooklyn in fiction
Novels set in Egypt
Novels set in London
Novels set in Saint Petersburg
2011 children's books
Novels by Rick Riordan
Hyperion Books books